The Chatham Granite Cash Spiel was an annual bonspiel on the men's  Ontario Curling Tour. It was held annually in November, at the Chatham Granite Club in Chatham, Ontario. Women's teams have participated in the past.

Past champions

External links
2012 Event Site

Ontario Curling Tour events
Chatham-Kent